The Signal Tower is a 1924 American silent drama film directed by Clarence Brown and produced and distributed by Universal Pictures. It stars Virginia Valli, Rockliffe Fellowes and Wallace Beery.

Cast
Virginia Valli as Sally Taylor
Rockliffe Fellowes as Dave Taylor
Frankie Darro as Sonny Taylor
Wallace Beery as Joe Standish
James O. Barrows as Old Bill
J. Farrell MacDonald as Pete
Dot Farley as Cousin Gertie
Clarence Brown as Switch Man
Jitney the Dog as Jitney

Preservation
A 16 mm copy of The Signal Tower is preserved by the UCLA Film and Television Archive.

References

External links

Lobby poster

1924 films
American silent feature films
Universal Pictures films
Films based on short fiction
Films directed by Clarence Brown
1924 drama films
American black-and-white films
Silent American drama films
1920s American films